"Unsquare Dance" is a composition by jazz pianist Dave Brubeck that was released as a single in 1961. Included on Brubeck's album Time Further Out, the piece reached No. 93 on the Cash Box chart on December 16, 1961.

Time signature 
Written in  time, the piece is an example of Brubeck's exploration of time signatures. According to Brubeck, it was written during a single trip from his home to the recording studio and was recorded the same day. The composition is based on a blues structure but also has a distinct country and western feel, as implied in the title (a square dance being a fixture of western US culture). "Unsquare Dance" is driven by a strong bass figure, with percussion provided primarily by the rim of the snare drum and hand claps. It combines duple and triple meter.

The piano enters with descending phrases crossing the  rhythm. The speed of the piece gradually increases from start to finish. The main theme then develops initially without left accompaniment and then with a characteristic figure based around the use of tenths. A drum solo using rim shots follows, then a restatement of the theme and a distinctive conclusion.

Brubeck says in his liner notes:

Chart performance 
"Unsquare Dance" was included on the album Time Further Out and became a hit single, peaking at No. 74 on the U.S. Billboard Hot 100 and No. 14 on the U.K.'s Record Retailer chart.

References 

1961 singles
1961 songs
CBS Records singles
Compositions by Dave Brubeck
Jazz compositions